Sean Kelly Gallery, founded in 1991 in New York City by British-born Sean Kelly, represents established and mid-career artists, particularly with work based in installation and performance.

Owner Sean Kelly began in the British museum world by curating shows by sculptors such as Richard Deacon and Anthony Gormley early in their career. He opened a place in SoHo, Manhattan, in 1995, with artists such as Marina Abramović, Joseph Kosuth, James Casebere and Robert Mapplethorpe.

History
The gallery was founded in 1991 and operated privately in SoHo, New York, until 1995. The original list of artists represented included Marina Abramović, Joseph Kosuth, James Casebere, Robert Mapplethorpe and Julião Sarmento, who are still represented by the gallery. In 1995, the gallery relocated to a street-level space in SoHo.

In 2001, Sean Kelly Gallery moved to 29th Street in the Chelsea gallery district. In 2012, it moved to a  space in the new Hudson Yards neighborhood. The two story gallery was designed by architect Toshiko Mori.

In 2018, Sean Kelly Gallery launched an initiative called Collect Wisely, an advertisement- and event-driven campaign aimed at reinvigorating the collectors’ interest in actual art, including ads placed in various publications (including the New York Times) featuring phrases like “Will history remember you as an investor or a collector?” and a billboard near the gallery on 10th Avenue carrying the slogan “Connoisseurship is not a dirty word.” Another element of Collect Wisely was a series of invite-only salons held at the gallery, where people from a variety of backgrounds — collectors, but also writers, musicians and scientists — gathered for dinner and to discuss art’s emotional, rather than monetary, value. Also, Kelly launched the Collect Wisely podcast, in which he talks one-to-one with collectors like Pamela Joyner and J. Tomilson Hill about the essential values of art, their reasons for collecting and their cultural passions.

Also in 2018, the gallery opened a project space in Taipei.

In 2021, Sean Kelly Gallery announced plans to open a  space in the Hollywood neighborhood of Los Angeles, again designed by Mori.

Artists
Artists represented by the gallery include:

In addition, the gallery manages various artist estates, including: 
 Ilse D'Hollander
 Poul Kjærholm
 Julião Sarmento

References

External links

Art galleries established in 1991
1991 establishments in New York City
Art museums and galleries in Manhattan
SoHo, Manhattan